Hong Kong Airlines Limited (stylised as HONGKONG AIRLINES) is an airline based in Hong Kong, with its headquarters in the Tung Chung district and its main hub at Hong Kong International Airport. It was established in 2006 as a member of the HNA Group and flies to 25 destinations across Asia Pacific.   The company slogan was changed from Fresh + very Hong Kong to Where Hong Kong Begins.

History

2001–2006: The early years 
Robert Yip, the chairman of China Rich Holdings, with business interests in Chinese medicine, internet portal, construction and property development, established CR Airways in Hong Kong on 28 March 2001. It was Hong Kong's third commercial helicopter operator and the first helicopter operator to receive an AOC since Hong Kong became a Special Administrative Region of China.

On 27 June 2003, CR Airways became Hong Kong's third passenger airline after receiving a revised AOC from the Director-General of Civil Aviation. It operated its first passenger service the next day. It started passenger charter operations to Laoag, Philippines on 5 July 2003, with a Bombardier CRJ200 leased from GE Capital Aviation Services. In September 2003, the airline applied for traffic rights to operate scheduled passenger services to Laoag and Chinese cities of Jinan, Naning, Meixian and Wenzhou. In addition, Robert Yip sold 40 percent of the airline to his company, China Rich Holdings, for HK$180 million. By March 2004, the airline had added Siem Reap, Cambodia to its charter network.

In April 2005, the Hong Kong Air Transport Licensing Authority (ATLA) granted a five-year licence to transport passengers, cargo and mail to China; the airline was free to apply for traffic rights to 10 cities in China. Then in July, the airline announced the imminent purchase of two Bombardier CRJ700s from Danish carrier Maersk Air. At year-end, a Memorandum of Understanding with Boeing for the purchase of 10 Boeing 787 Dreamliners and 30 Boeing 737-800s for US$3.28 billion took the business to the next level. Some of the aircraft were from a prior Hainan Airlines order.

2006–2010: Change of ownership and fleet expansion 
On 27 June 2006, Hainan Airlines secured a 45 percent holding in the airline, by purchase of convertible notes held by Yu Ming Investments, which was to be injected into its new airline holding company Grand China Air. Two months later, Mung Kin-keung acquired the remaining 55 percent of the airline and became the controlling shareholder on 7 August; and its director on 13 August.  Mung's previous main business interest had been a 30 percent holding in Banana Leaf (Asia Pacific) Catering Group Company Ltd, a restaurant operator.

On 22 September 2006, CR Airways Ltd officially changed its name to Hong Kong Airlines Ltd, with a launch ceremony on 28 November 2006. The airline also introduced a new logo, which represents a bauhinia flower, the symbol of Hong Kong where the airline is anchored. The airline made the biggest aircraft order in its young history on 21 June 2007, by ordering 51 narrow- and wide-body aircraft from European plane maker, Airbus, at an estimated value of US$5.6 billion. The airline's IATA code was changed from N8 to HX on 27 May 2007.

On 24 October 2008, in preparation for the arrival of the Airbus A330-200 wide-body aircraft, the airline announced plans to adjust personnel and fleet composition. The new aircraft were to provide medium haul passenger and cargo services to the Middle East and Australia.

2010–2012: Growth and expansion 
On 8 June 2010, Hong Kong Airlines completed their flight certification from Hong Kong to Beijing, earning an Air Operator's Certificate for the Airbus A330 operations from the Hong Kong Civil Aviation Department. Scheduled flights to Moscow were launched later that month.

In September 2010, the airline introduced its first Airbus A330F cargo freighter, on a route from Hong Kong to Hangzhou.  It officially joined the IATA the next month.

In 2011, Hong Kong Airlines was awarded a 4-star rating by Skytrax.  Passenger traffic exceeded one million passengers serving 19 destinations.

On 8 March 2012, the airline launched daily flights from Hong Kong to London Gatwick airport with an Airbus A330-200 aircraft. It operated as an all Club Class service, featuring 34 "Club Premier" (business class lie-flat beds) and 82 "Club Classic" (cradle style recliner business class) seats, the service lasted only six months.

2012–2016: Repositioning 
In 2013, Hong Kong Airlines concluded a system-wide strategy review to determine its priority routes for the immediate future with key focus areas on the Asia Pacific region during this period. One new route was established when the Hong Kong-Maldives service was inaugurated.  Total passenger traffic had reached over four million and the last of its Boeing aircraft were retired.

In 2014, Hong Kong Airlines launched new passenger routes between Hong Kong and Ho Chi Minh City, Tianjin and Kagoshima; they also increased daily flight frequency to Beijing and Shanghai.

The airline's lounge service was relaunched as "Club Bauhinia" on 27 June 2014.

In February 2015, Hong Kong Airlines signed a sub-lease with the Airport Authority Hong Kong to develop a flight training center on a  plot near the southeast perimeter of the Hong Kong International Airport. In March 2015, the airline joined the Executive Committee of the Board of Airline Representatives in Hong Kong (BAR HK), holding hands with another almost 80 airlines to improve the commercial and operational conditions for airlines active in Hong Kong. On 28 December 2015, Hong Kong Airlines flight HX658 bound for Okinawa became the first departure from the HKIA Midfield Concourse (MFC).

2016–2018: Seeking intercontinental expansion 
In April 2017, the firm's air cargo business in Hong Kong was set up as an independent subsidiary cargo airline of Hong Kong (Hong Kong Air Cargo), having received its operator's licence from the Hong Kong Civil Aviation Department. In June 2017, Skytrax ranked Hong Kong Airlines second-best regional airline and 24th best internationally. On 8 August 2017, Atlas Air announced that it had placed three 747-400 freighters with Hong Kong Air Cargo, the airline's cargo subsidiary. The first aircraft was to enter service in September 2017, serving routes between the United States and Asia. Delivery of the remaining two aircraft was anticipated during 2018. All three aircraft were to be operated by Atlas Air on behalf of Hong Kong Air Cargo.

In September 2017, Hong Kong Airlines took delivery of its first Airbus A350-900, which shortly began service to and from Bangkok (BKK). The company also launched its "Club Autus" VIP lounge at the HKIA Midfield Concourse. On 18 December 2017, Hong Kong Airlines started operating a direct flight to Los Angeles with the A350-900 aircraft, and direct flights to San Francisco followed three months later.

2018–Present : Economic hardship and scaling back 
In late 2018, both co-chairmen, Mung and Zhang Kui, resigned, as did the airline's vice-chairman and CFO. Former vice-president and chief marketing officer of Hainan Airlines, Hou Wei, took over as chairman in November 2018.

The attempted expansion was draining the company financially, and in March 2019, it announced a cutback in its passenger fleet, from 38 to 28 planes, and reduced services on some of its new international routes, including to Vancouver, San Francisco, and Los Angeles.

In an attempt to roll back loss-making long-haul services in favour of more profitable Asian destinations, flights to Gold Coast and Cairns were suspended from October 2018 and the last Auckland flight departed for Hong Kong on 22 May 2019.

On 5 October 2019 its San Francisco flight, launched less than two years earlier, was suspended. The airline also discontinued its Hong Kong-Fuzhou service from 2 September, while boosting flights to three short-haul destinations.

The carrier added a daily flight between Hong Kong and Haikou from 2 September, four additional weekly flights between Hong Kong and Hangzhou from 8 September and two additional weekly flights between Hong Kong and Sapporo from 28 September. The arrangements brought the total number of its Haikou, Hangzhou and Sapporo services to three daily flights, 14 weekly flights, and 11 weekly flights, respectively.

By November 2019 the airline was facing severe financial difficulties due to the ongoing Sino-US trade conflict, coupled with political and social unrest in Hong Kong and was reportedly unable to pay the employees salaries on time. On 29 November the airline announced that it would end its remaining long-haul flights, to Los Angeles and Vancouver, from February 2020, leaving HKA as a purely regional airline. It also announced the termination of its in-flight entertainment system from 1 December 2019, to cut costs.

On 7 February 2020, as the COVID-19 pandemic hit many airlines hard, HKA announced it was cutting 400 jobs – ten percent of the workforce, mainly pilots and cabin crew, and asked remaining staff to take two months' unpaid leave or switch to a three-day week.

On 18 February 2020, HKA announced that it would suspend in-flight services such as food, drinks and blankets to help stop the spread of COVID-19.  The next day HKA also announced they would be laying off 170 additional employees, mostly flight attendants.

In June 2021, Hong Kong Airlines announced it would ground its entire fleet of A320s with only eight A330s flying in the interim, prioritizing cargo. The latest plan also calls for cutting hundreds more jobs.

Corporate affairs

Headquarters
The airline's head office is at One Citygate in Tung Chung, close to Hong Kong International Airport.

Subsidiaries
Hong Kong Aviation Ground Services Ltd (HAGSL) is a provider of passenger self-handling services at Hong Kong International Airport and HKA Holidays Ltd (HKA Holidays) offers travel products, including fixed charter flights tickets, tour packages and hotel accommodation.

Community engagement
In 2015, Hong Kong Airlines was selected as the Official Carrier for the Hong Kong Paralympic Committee and the Sports Association for the Physically Disabled.  The airline has joined the Caritas Fund Raising Bazaar for six consecutive years from 2009 and sponsored Hong Kong events marking the "World Diabetes Day 2012". The airline also has a number of student sponsorship and aviation education programmes, including its "Triumph Sky High" Junior Programme, "Embrace the World" Student Sponsorship Programme and "School Sharing Workshops".

Loyalty programme 

A frequent flyer program, the Fortune Wings Club, is operated by Hong Kong Airlines and its sister airlines Grand China Air, Grand China Express, Hainan Airlines and Lucky Air. Membership benefits include air ticket redemption and upgrade; dedicated First or Business Class check-in counters, Club Autus and Club Bauhinia lounge access, bonus mileage and extra baggage allowance.

Cabin services

Business class 
Business class on long haul flights has 180-degree flat beds and direct aisle access. Passengers may use two business lounges: Club Autus and Club Bauhinia. They can also earn Fortune Wing Points, depending on their fare class.

Economy class 
Most economy class seats do not feature personal televisions (PTV), even on long haul aircraft. On long haul flights, passengers are given complimentary tablets, which serve as an in-flight entertainment system, including video-on-demand.

Destinations

Codeshare agreements 
Hong Kong Airlines codeshares with the following airlines:

 Air Astana
 Air India
 Air Mauritius
 Asiana Airlines
 Bangkok Airways
 China Eastern Airlines
 El Al
 Etihad Airways
 EVA Air
 Fiji Airways
 Garuda Indonesia
 Grand China Air
 Hainan Airlines
 Kenya Airways
 Royal Brunei Airlines
 Shanghai Airlines
 South African Airways
 Turkish Airlines
 Virgin Australia

Fleet

Current fleet 
, Hong Kong Airlines operates an all-Airbus fleet composed of the following aircraft.

Fleet history 
Hong Kong Airlines has previously operated the following aircraft:

See also 
 List of airlines of Hong Kong
 List of airports in Hong Kong
 List of companies of Hong Kong
 Transport in Hong Kong

References

External links 

 
 Official Hong Kong Airlines Holidays website
 Hong Kong Airlines press releases

Airlines established in 2006
Airlines of Hong Kong
HNA Group
Hong Kong brands